Government College Gujranwala (گورنمنٹ کالج گوجرانوالہ) alias Government Postgraduate College for Boys Satellite Town Gujranwala is one of the oldest educational institution of Gujranwala. The foundation stone was laid by Education Adviser of Government of Pakistan, S.M.Sharif (Cantab) on 1 March 1955. It is situated on Pasrur Road, Gujranwala and it's adjacent to Satellite Town of Gujranwala.

Academics
There are 22 working departments in college. The college is offering degrees with the affiliation of Punjab University in 11 subjects :
BS (Hons) English
BS (Hons) Physics 
BS (Hons) Chemistry 
BS (Hons) Mathematics
BS (Hons) Social Work 
BS (Hons) Information Technology 
BS (Hons) Economics 
BS (Hons) Commerce 
BS (Hons) Statistics 
BS (Hons) Zoology 
BS (Hons) Botany 
and 5 Higher Secondary School Certificates with affiliation of BISE GRW including:
Fsc (Pre-Medical)
Fsc (Pre-Engineering)
ICs
ICom
FA

References

Public universities and colleges in Punjab, Pakistan
1955 establishments in Pakistan
Education in Gujranwala